Vivian Sung Yun-hua (born 21 October 1992) is a Taiwanese actress. She is best known for the films Café. Waiting. Love (2014) and Our Times  (2015), as well as the television series Lost Romance (2020). She was nominated for the Best Actress award at the 52nd Golden Horse Awards for her role as Lin Zhen-xin in Our Times.

Career
Before her debut, Sung starred in many short films and music videos, mostly along with her friends. She first appeared in IGUband's music video "So I Stopped". The music video was widely circulated amongst students, resulting in her receiving many short film offers. Thereafter, with a growing interest in the entertainment industry, Sung began by signing a contract with Star Ritz.

Sung's debut movie was screenwriter and producer Giddens Ko's romance film Café. Waiting. Love, in which she plays the lead role of Lee Si-ying. Ko said on his blog that he was hoping to find new people to play the lead roles and had to do a lot of interviews and auditions. At that time, Sung was still a third-year university student, studying at Fu Jen Catholic University, Department of Textiles and Clothing. After Sung's interview with film producer Angie Chai, Ko told his agent, "This girl is perfect for the role!" After several rounds of auditions and interviews, Sung was chosen to play the role. Café. Waiting. Love premiered in August 2014, earning more than NT$200 million at the Taiwan box office, earning Sung much recognition.

In 2015, Sung starred in her second film, Our Times, as lead character Lin Zhen-xin. The film's producer, Yeh Ju-fen, said that after ten auditions, she had never seen an actor like Sung. Director Frankie Chen said in an interview that Sung is a logical thinking girl, but her character is the complete opposite and acts based on her instincts instead. Hence, on her first day of filming, Sung could not even get into character. Mentor Xu Jiehui suggested to break down Sung's elegance, forcing her to learn how to be her character by unlearning how to be herself.

Our Times topped the box office in Taiwan, earning more than NT$400 million. Sung received her first award nomination for Best Actress at the 52nd Golden Horse Awards. Then 22 years old, she was the youngest among the five candidates. While Sung did not win the award, she was praised for her performance of the theme song, "A Little Happiness," at the awards ceremony.

After appearing in two movies, Sung appeared in the TVBS television series Taste of Love as the lead actress, in which she played a tour guide overly obsessed with good food.

In 2016, Sung was cast as the lead character, Shen-xi, in the Chinese fantasy web-series Proud of Love. The first season aired on Youku on 9 September 2016, and concluded with the second season on 1 January 2017.

The third film that Sung starred in, as lead character Li En-pei, was Take Me to the Moon, which premiered in December 2017.

In 2020, Sung starred in the idol drama Lost Romance, in which she played an editor of a publishing company who finds herself transported into the pages of a romance novel and comes face-to-face with the man of her dreams (played by Marcus Chang). Lost Romance placed number one in its time slot during most of its run, and Sung and Chang were praised for their on-screen chemistry.

On 28 November 2020, Sung started her YouTube channel where she posts videos with her celebrity friends like Marcus Chang, Bruce Hung, and Simon Lian.

Filmography

Film

Television series

Music video

Awards and nominations

References

External links

 
 
 

1992 births
Living people
Taiwanese Taoists
Fu Jen Catholic University alumni
Taiwanese film actresses
Taiwanese television actresses
21st-century Taiwanese actresses
Actresses from Taipei